David Pearce (born March 30, 1960 in  Warrensburg, Missouri) is a Republican member of the Missouri Senate, representing the 21st District since 2009. Previously he was a member of the Missouri House of Representatives from 2003 through 2008.

In addition to his legislative duties, Rep. Pearce is a banker with First Community Bank in Warrensburg. He also served as director for the 500-member Warrensburg Chamber of Commerce from 1988 to 1994 and as a school board member for the Warrensburg School District until April 2004.

A master certified board member of the Missouri School Boards Association, Rep. Pearce is a member of the following organizations: First Presbyterian Church; Warrensburg Rotary; District III Area Agency on Aging Futures Task Force; Whiteman Air Force Base Community Council; American Cancer Society Relay for Life, treasurer; FFA Made for Excellence, director; Johnson County United Way, 2004-2005 campaign chairman.

Personal life
A 1978 graduate of Warrensburg High School, Rep. Pearce attended Central Missouri State University and received a Bachelor of Science degree in agri-journalism from the University of Missouri in 1984. He resides in Warrensburg with his wife, Teresa, and their children: Molly and Andrew.

References

Official Manual, State of Missouri, 2005-2006. Jefferson City, MO: Secretary of State.

External links
David Pearce at the Missouri Senate website

1960 births
Living people
People from Warrensburg, Missouri
American Presbyterians
Republican Party members of the Missouri House of Representatives
Republican Party Missouri state senators
21st-century American politicians